This is a list of Standard French words and phrases deriving from any Germanic language of any period, whether incorporated in the formation of the French language or borrowed at any time thereafter.

Historical background
French is a Romance language descended primarily from the Gallo-Roman language, a form of Vulgar Latin, spoken in the late Roman Empire by the Gauls and more specifically the Belgae. However, northern Gaul from the Rhine southward to the Loire starting in the 3rd century was gradually co-populated  by a Germanic confederacy, the Franks, culminating after the departure of the Roman administration in a re-unification by the first Christian king of the Franks, Clovis I, in AD 486. From the name of his domain, Francia (which covered northern France, the lowlands and much of Germany), comes the modern name, France. For a few centuries, sizeable minorities of Frankish speaking peasants held on to their native language, but in northern France they shifted to their own dialect of Gallo-Roman.

The first Franks spoke Frankish, a Western Germanic language. As the Frankish Kingdom expanded under the reigns of Charles Martel and Pepin the Short, becoming the earliest Holy Roman Empire under Charlemagne, the common language differentiated into a number of mutually incomprehensible languages of Europe. The main division was between High German and Low German. The dividing zone was the Rhenish Fan. The Ripuarian and Carolingian Franks came to speak a form of Old High German. The Salian Franks spoke Old Frankish or Old Franconian, which later evolved into Old Dutch. The Franks in northern Gaul adopted their own version of Gallo-Roman, which became French. France emerged after the heirs of Charlemagne divided the empire along linguistic lines.

In France, Germanic language continued to be spoken among the kings and nobility until the time of the Capetian Kings (10th century). Hugh Capet (AD 987), born to a Saxon mother, was reportedly the first King of France to need an interpreter when addressed by envoys from Frankish Germany. Generally, Frankish nobles of the Carolingian dynasty were bilingual in Frankish and Gallo-Romance. The Neustrian army had received orders in Gallo-Romance since the time of the Oaths of Strasbourg. The situation was not unlike the one in England after the Norman Conquest, with Frankish nobility occupying the role of superstratum language over the existing Proto-Romance language spoken by the populace.

The development of French
As a result of over 500 years of Germano-Latin bilingualism, many Germanic words became ingrafted into the Gallo-Romance speech by the time it emerged as Old French in AD 900. And after the Franks abandoned Frankish, their version of Old French tended to be heavily Frankish influenced, with a distinctively Frankish accent, which introduced new phonemes, stress-timing, Germanic grammatical and syntactical elements, and contained many more Germanic loans not found in the Old French spoken by the native Gallo-Romans. Even though the Franks were largely outnumbered by the Gallo-Roman population, the position of the Franks as leaders and landholders lent their version of Old French a greater power of influence over that of the Gallo-Romans; it thereby became the basis of later versions of the French language, including Modern French (see Francien language). It is for this reason that Modern French pronunciation has a rather distinct and undeniably "Germanic" sound when compared to other Romance languages, such as Italian and Spanish, and is a major contributing factor in why there exists a distinction between Northern French varieties spoken in regions where Frankish settlement was heavy (langue d'oïl) vs. those where Frankish settlement was relatively slight (langue d'oc).

Although approximately ten percent of Modern French words are derived from Frankish, Frankish was not the only source of Germanic words in French. Gothic languages, like Burgundian, made contributions (via Provençal), as did Old Norse and Old English via Norman French. Other words were borrowed directly from Old, Middle and Modern versions of Dutch and German, and still others came through the Germanic elements found in Latin (particularly Medieval Latin) and other Romance languages, like Walloon, Italian, and Spanish. Finally, Modern English has made contributions to the French lexicon, most notably within the past few decades.

Scope of the dictionary
The following list details words, affixes and phrases that contain Germanic etymons. Words where only an affix is Germanic (e.g. méfait, bouillard, carnavalesque) are excluded, as are words borrowed from a Germanic language where the origin is other than Germanic (for instance, cabaret is from Dutch, but the Dutch word is ultimately from Latin/Greek, so it is omitted). Likewise, words which have been calqued from a Germanic tongue (e.g. pardonner, bienvenue, entreprendre, toujours, compagnon, plupart, manuscrit, manoeuvre), or which received their usage or sense (i.e. were created, modified or influenced) due to Germanic speakers or Germanic linguistic habits (e.g. comté, avec, commun, on, panne, avoir, ça) are not included.

Many other Germanic words found in older versions of French, such as Old French and Anglo-French are no longer extant in Standard Modern French. Many of these words do, however, continue to survive dialectally and in English. See: List of English Latinates of Germanic origin.

A-B

C-G

H-Z

See also
 History of French
 Franks
 Old Frankish
 Influence of French on English
 List of French words of Gaulish origin
 List of Galician words of Germanic origin
 List of German words of French origin
 List of Portuguese words of Germanic origin
 List of Spanish words of Germanic origin

Notes

References
Auguste Brachet, An Etymological Dictionary of the French Language: Third Edition
Auguste Scheler, "Dictionnaire d'étymologie française d'après les résultats de la science moderne" 
Centre National de Ressources Textuelles et Lexicales 
Dictionary.com
Friedrich Diez, "An Etymological Dictionary of the Romance Languages"
Dossier des Latinistes, La Greffe Germanique 

French Germanic
Germanic